Fausto Ricci (born 13 March 1961) is a Italian former Grand Prix motorcycle road racer. His best year was in 1985 when he finished fifth in the 250cc world championship. He won the first Grand Prix he entered at the 1984 250cc Nations Grand Prix held at Misano, but was never able to win another race.

References 

1961 births
Living people
Italian motorcycle racers
125cc World Championship riders
250cc World Championship riders